The 1973 Fidelity Tournament, also known as the Richmond WCT, was a men's professional tennis tournament that was part of the Group A of the 1973 World Championship Tennis circuit. It was held on indoor carpet courts at the Richmond Coliseum in Richmond, Virginia in the United States. It was the eighth edition of the tournament and was held from January 30 through February 4, 1973. First-seeded Rod Laver won his second consecutive singles title at the event and earned $10,000 first-prize money.

Finals

Singles

 Rod Laver defeated  Roy Emerson 6–4, 6–3
 It was Laver's 2nd singles title of the year and the 57th of his career in the Open Era.

Doubles
 Roy Emerson /  Rod Laver defeated  Terry Addison /  Colin Dibley 3–6, 6–3, 6–4

References

External links
 ITF tournament edition details

Richmond WCT
Richmond WCT
Richmond WCT
Richmond WCT
Richmond WCT
Tennis in Virginia